Alcohol is a peer-reviewed medical journal covering research on the health effects of alcohol consumption. It was established in 1984 and is published nine times per year by Elsevier. The editor-in-chief is David Lovinger (National Institute on Alcohol Abuse and Alcoholism). According to the Journal Citation Reports, the journal has a 2014 impact factor of 2.006.

References

External links

Addiction medicine journals
Publications established in 1984
Elsevier academic journals
English-language journals
9 times per year journals